Ian R Peel (born 18 January 1958 in Skipton-on-Swale, North Yorkshire, England is a sport shooter who has represented Great Britain in the Summer Olympic Games on three occasions.

Sport shooting career
Peel first appeared at the Olympics in the 1988 Games in Seoul where he finished 25th in the mixed trap event. Twelve years later he competed in the 2000 Summer Olympics in Sydney and won the silver medal in the men's trap. He participated in his third Games in Athens in 2004 finishing tied for 19th in the men's trap.

He represented England and won two gold medals in the trap and trap pairs with Peter Boden, at the 1986 Commonwealth Games in Edinburgh, Scotland. Four years later represented England and won a gold medal in the trap pairs with Kevin Gill and a bronze medal in the individual trap, at the 1990 Commonwealth Games in Auckland, New Zealand. After missing the 1994 games he competed in his third Games at the 1998 Commonwealth Games where he once again won medals in the trap events; two silvers and a bronze with Bob Borsley. A fourth and final appearance at the 2002 Commonwealth Games resulted in his eighth medal after a winning a pairs silver with Christopher Dean.

References

1958 births
Living people
British male sport shooters
Trap and double trap shooters
Olympic shooters of Great Britain
Shooters at the 1988 Summer Olympics
Shooters at the 2000 Summer Olympics
Shooters at the 2004 Summer Olympics
Olympic silver medallists for Great Britain
Olympic medalists in shooting
Commonwealth Games medallists in shooting
Commonwealth Games gold medallists for England
Commonwealth Games silver medallists for England
Commonwealth Games bronze medallists for England
Shooters at the 1986 Commonwealth Games
Shooters at the 1990 Commonwealth Games
Shooters at the 1998 Commonwealth Games
Shooters at the 2002 Commonwealth Games
Medalists at the 2000 Summer Olympics
Medallists at the 1986 Commonwealth Games
Medallists at the 1990 Commonwealth Games
Medallists at the 1998 Commonwealth Games
Medallists at the 2002 Commonwealth Games